Love for the Streets is the third studio album by Swedish rock band Caesars Palace.

Track listing
 "Over 'fore It Started" – 2:50
 "Candy Kane" – 2:36
 "Mine All of the Time" – 2:04
 "Let My Freak Flag Fly" – 2:35
 "Cheap Glue" – 2:22
 "Jerk It Out" – 3:14
 "Burn the City Down" – 4:09
 "Do-Nothing" – 2:06
 "I Gun for You, Part II" – 0:55
 "Fifteen Minutes Too Late" – 1:53
 "She Don't Mind" – 2:10
 "I Gun for You" – 3:39
 "Black Heart" – 1:28
 "Thousand-Mile-Stare" – 1:41

Credits
 Jockum Nordström – Artwork [Sleeve Concept By] – Jockum Nordström
 David Lindqvist – bass
 Fabian "Phat Fabe" Torsson – co-producer
 Nino Keller – drums
 The Internal Dread – engineer (tracks: 1–10, 12–14)
 Fabian, Johan Forsman – engineer (additional)
 Joakim Åhlund – guitar, vocals
 Björn Engelmann – mastering
 Fabian Torsson, Joakim Åhlund – mixer
 Joakim Åhlund – producer
 César Vidal – vocals

Charts

Weekly charts

Year-end charts

References

2002 albums
Caesars (band) albums